Esteban de Bilbao Eguía (11 January 1879 – 23 September 1970) was a Spanish politician during the dictatorship of Francisco Franco.

Family and youth

Esteban Martín Higinio de Bilbao Eguía was born to a Basque mid-range bourgeoisie family. His paternal grandfather, Manuel Bilbao, ran a merchant business in his native town of Guernica (Biscay province); one of his sons became a presbyter, while another, Hilario Bilbao Ortúzar, moved to Bilbao and practiced as a physician. He married María Concepción Matea de Eguía Galindez, descendant to a distinguished and much-branched Biscay family. The couple had 6 children, with Esteban born as the oldest of 2 brothers and 4 sisters. All Bilbao Eguía children were brought up in a fervently Catholic ambience, though none of the sources consulted provides any information on political preferences of their parents.

The young Esteban was first educated at Instituto Provincial, the local state-run Bilbao secondary education establishment. Sources provide different details of his exact academic path, though most agree that he studied law and philosophy first in the Jesuit university of Deusto in Bilbao, later moving to the prestigious Universidad de Salamanca and completing both curriculums. Bilbao crowned his scientific career obtaining PhD laurels in law in Universidad Central of Madrid. Having returned to his native Biscay he opened the law office and in 1904 was registered as practicing abogado in Bilbao. In 1913 he married María de Uribasterra e Ibarrondo (1891-1976). The couple had no issue.

Early public activity

It is unclear whether Bilbao inherited the Carlist outlook from his forefathers or whether he rather embraced it during the academic years. In 1902 he was already firmly established in local Biscay structures of mainstream Carlism, and together with national pundits like Juan Vázquez de Mella toured the province, organizing meetings and delivering speeches. In 1904 he ran as a Carlist in elections to the Bilbao City Council and was successful; some sources claim he was later nominated teniente de alcalde. As he objected to presence of a Protestant minister during an official municipal act, the government charged him with breaching the constitution and cancelled his mandate.

Pursuing Catholic militancy against mounting secularization promoted by Madrid governments, Bilbao played pivotal role in the Biscay Juventud Católica; he also threw himself into a number of other local Catholic initiatives, e.g. representing Carlism at public meetings against secular schools. His activities climaxed at the turn of the decades, during public uproar caused by the so-called Ley del Candado. Forming part of the Biscay Junta Católica he took part in countless gatherings and events, the most notable of them Acto de Zumarraga of 1910. As some of his harangues bordered legality he was three times trialed, though the outcome is unknown.

Within the Traditionalist ranks Bilbao together with other Deusto students Victor Pradera and Julio Urquijo formed a new generation of activists, promoted by the claimant Carlos VII and the party leader marqués de Cerralbo in their bid to build a modern Carlist network. In 1907 he was fielded as the official party candidate to the Cortes from the Álavese district of Vitoria. His debut turned to be a fratricidal war, since another Carlist, Enrique Ortiz de Zarate, competed backed by the youth and more militant electorate; as a result, both Carlists lost. In 1910 Bilbao was rumored to replace Vazquez de Mella as a Jaimist candidate in the Navarrese Pamplona, but eventually it was the latter who stood and won. In the successive campaign of 1914 Bilbao ran in his native Biscay, in Durango, but lost again, this time to a conservative candidate, José de Amézola y Aspizua, with ensuing riots between supporters of both candidates.

Bilbao embraced the Basque self the Carlist way, defending local provincial fueros and ethnic identity as indispensable elements constituting the common Spanish political nation. He took part in the first Congreso de Estudios Vascos and was given a privilege of delivering the closing address; when speaking, he commiserated with persecuted "madre Euskal Herria" and voiced in favor of a Basque university, which would carry out the work of "restauración cultural vasca". He remained active also during the following congresses until the late 1920s and played vital role in its Sección de Estudios Sociales; he demonstrated interest in the social question also beyond the Basque realm, publishing a leaflet "La cuestion social".

Cortes and Asamblea Nacional
Following unsuccessful electoral campaigns in Álava, Navarre and Biscay, in 1916 Bilbao competed in the Carlist national stronghold, the Gipuzkoan district of Tolosa. He defeated the conservative candidate and formed part of the 9-member Jaimist minority in the Cortes. In 1918 he stood in the same district and was re-elected. Active defending the Church, religion and Traditionalism, he distinguished himself as one of the most notable Carlist orators, though by some he is described as having a penchant for purple rhetoric.

During the Mellista crisis Bilbao remained loyal to successive claimant Don Jaime and worked closely with him, editing some of his proclamations and documents. As the secession decimated the Jaimist ranks, Bilbao became the local Biscay jefe and in 1919 he was fielded as provincial Jaimist candidate to the Senate. Elected, he remained active working on syndical laws and autonomous status of the universities. It is not clear why in 1920 he abandoned his senatorial status and decided to run for the Cortes again; this time he returned to Navarre and was elected from another Carlist stronghold, the Estella district. In 1923, during the last parliamentarian campaign of the Restoration, the Carlist king ordered abstention and no official candidates were fielded.

Though most Carlists welcomed the Primo de Rivera coup, considering it a stepping stone towards a traditionalist, anti-democratic monarchy, their sympathy soon evaporated and Don Jaime obliged his followers not to enter the primoderiverista institutions. Bilbao ignored the ban and remained one of the most vocal advocates of the dictatorship. In 1924 he joined the new state party, Unión Patriótica; in 1926 he was nominated president of Diputación de Bizkaia and holding the job for 4 years he worked to negotiate the provincial concierto económico; finally, in 1927 he joined the newly appointed quasi-parliament, Asamblea Nacional Consultiva as a representative of diputaciones provinciales. It is not clear which of these acts was the straw which broke the camel's back; Don Jaime and his political representative in Spain marqués de Villores remained firm and expulsed Bilbao from the party ranks. Retaining his Carlist identity, Bilbao approached the Mellista branch of Traditionalism.

He remained active also as a Catholic politician, since the early 1920s heading the Biscay section of Acción Católica; he later took part in the first national congress and delivered an address. In 1929 he worked to launch a new Catholic political grouping, but the initiative came to naught as it was greeted with at best lukewarm reception from the primate Segura. During the Dictablanda period Bilbao approached the orphaned monarchist primoderiveristas from Unión Monárquica Nacional, speaking at their public meetings.

Republic

Sources consulted provide contradictory information on Bilbao's relations with mainstream Carlism after the fall of the monarchy. Some authors claim that though many Carlists felt that advent of the militantly secular Republic required unification of various Traditionalist branches, Bilbao was not enthusiastic about returning under the command of Don Jaime. Other scholars maintain that already in April 1931 he edited the claimant's proclamation, which instructed the Carlists to help maintain order and to stay alert to the threat of foreign-inspired tyranny. Equally incompatible is the information that in late 1931 and early 1932 Bilbao brokered a failed dynastical agreement with the deposed Alfonso XIII.

Following unexpected death of Don Jaime Bilbao dashed any doubts he might have had and together with Pradera he led the Mellistas into the united Carlist organization, Comunión Tradicionalista, becoming head of its Biscay section and joining the national Junta Suprema. He forged close working relation with the new claimant, Don Alfonso Carlos, co-editing a number of his proclamations and documents, including those which seemed to confirm the late Don Jaime's policy of opening dynastical negotiations with the Alfonsinos. Himself he was also inclined towards a dynastical pact and is listed as one of the so-called "transaccionistas". He engaged in the monarchist alliance and contributed to Acción Española. Some sources claim he joined the manifesto launching a new broad alliance, Bloque Nacional, while other authors maintain he was one of the few leaders who did not sign.

From the onset Bilbao contributed to the Carlist military buildup. In the summer of 1931 he was in touch with Comité de Acción Jaimista, an organization launched to gather vigilantes protecting religious buildings. He was agreed to enter the monarchist military junta, to be headed by general Emilio Barrera, in October 1931 briefly detained and in early 1932 administered 2 months of exile in Navia de Suarna (Lugo province). He was at least aware of and possibly somehow involved in the Sanjurjo coup, though the authorities did not identify Bilbao as complicit. Opposing dissolution of the Jesuit order and enforcement of secular schools cost him further detentions and two court trials.

In 1933 Bilbao resumed his parliament duties elected as a Carlist deputy from Navarre; he later defended traditional Navarrese fueros, though he voiced against the autonomy of Catalonia. The same year together with other party pundits like Jesús Comín he entered the 18-member Council of Culture, the body which exercised little power, but brought together Carlists of different origins and strengthened the new leadership of Manuel Fal Conde. In 1935 Bilbao reached the highest level of Carlist executive when he entered the 5-member Council of the Comunión. Within the already militant and fervently anti-Republican Traditionalist camp Bilbao formed an even more hawkish group; he refused to stand in the 1936 elections for his self-proclaimed hatred of parliamentarism.

Civil War

It is not clear how Bilbao contributed to the military conspiracy and what was his position in Carlist debates on conditions of their access to the rebellion; during the July 1936 coup he was in his summer home in Durango. Detained by the Basque authorities on the Altunamendi ship, in late September, thanks mostly to the efforts of Marcel Junod, he was exchanged for the Bilbao mayor Ernesto Ercoreca and made it via France to the Nationalist zone. He entered Junta Nacional Carlista de Guerra and was nominated member of its Sección Politica, settling close to Cuartel General del Generalissimo in Salamanca.

Starting late 1936 Carlism was increasingly paralyzed by its unclear governing structure and political indecision, especially when cornered by Franco and his chief aide, Ramón Serrano Suñer. As member of the Carlist executive Bilbao took part at least in some meetings of early 1937, called to discuss the looming threat of amalgamation within a future state party. During the Insua gathering he did not illude himself that a new regime would resemble the mild Primo's dictatorship; he seemed aware of the centralist, anti-regionalist design advanced by Franco and warned against "un gobierno definitivo de tipo falangista" and the regime "fuerte, dictatorial y cesarista", but nevertheless he tended to hesitantly accept the unification perspective against the intransigent fraction of Fal. The semi-rebellious Carlist body, Junta Central Carlista de Guerra de Navarra, pursued an appeasing strategy and tried to assume leading role within the movement by suggesting a re-organization of Carlism; within this scheme, Bilbao was proposed to lead its Sección Politica. Nothing came out of these plans as Franco pressed for action and soon declared his Unification Decree.

Faced with a choice between compliance of Rodezno and intransigence of Fal, Bilbao aligned himself with the Francoist unification and joined the newly established FET. Though he was not among 4 Carlists who entered the first 10-member Secretariado of the party, in October 1937 as one of 12 Traditionalists he was nominated into the totally decorative 50-member body, Consejo Nacional. Vehemently asked by Fal Conde not to accept, Bilbao stuck to his guns and in December 1937 the new regent-claimant Don Javier and Fal agreed to expulse him from the Comunión. With all bridges burnt, following transformation of the Secretariat into Junta Politica, the new FET executive, Bilbao emerged as one of two top-positioned Carlists of the regime, becoming the Junta's member in October 1939. He exercised little if any influence on the emerging party; its Estatuto and internal structures were designed by Serrano, who – together with his Falangist entourage – became Bilbao's chief opponent. He rather excelled as a speaker, mobilising support at Vascongadas public feasts.

Minister of Justice
In 1938 Bilbao became president of Comisión de codificación within the Francoist Ministry of Justice and commenced work on buildup of the Francoist legal code. When his fellow Carlist, conde Rodezno, left the ministerial seat, in August 1939 Bilbao replaced him, holding the post until 1943. As Minister of Justice he presided over one of the most repressive legal systems of modern Europe.

In terms of number of judicial executions, early Francoist Spain exceeded Nazi Germany and was second only to the Soviet regime. The number of death penalties sentenced in few years following the Civil War was 51,000, though nearly half were reduced by Franco and there were some 28,000 people executed. When assuming the ministry Bilbao oversaw the greatest single wave of incarcerations, which brought the number of political inmates from 100,000 at the end of the civil war to 270,000 by the end of 1939. In the following years this figure dropped steadily thanks to a series of amnesties and when leaving ministry he admitted to 75,000 political prisoners. In the meantime, thousands of them died in overcrowded prisons. Though labor camps in general remained under the military, his ministry provided juridical assistance, the end result having been some 90,000 people working in usually atrocious conditions in penal detachments. Brutality of the system shocked even Heinrich Himmler.

Bilbao coordinated work on the Francoist repressive legislation, with its cornerstones Ley de Responsabilidades Políticas (1939), Ley de Represión de la Masonería y Communismo (1940) and Ley de Seguridad del Estado (1941). He developed appropriate juridical organization, e.g. setting up Tribunal Especial para la Represión de la Masonería y el Comunismo. As minister he contributed to legal groundwork for the so-called niños robados, for Patronato Central de Redención de Penas por el Trabajo, with some 10,5 thousand children covered in 1943, and for Patronato de Protección a la Mujer. Under his guidance the divorce and marriage legislation of the Republic was retroactively reversed. Though extremely repressive, unlike the Soviet system the Francoist machinery under Bilbao recognized limits and normally respected its own rules.

While during Primo's dictatorship Bilbao as head of the Biscay Diputación defended local fueros, nothing is known about his stance on Francoist political penalty applied to Biscay and Gipuzkoa, considered "provincias traidoras" and stripped off any remnants of separate local establishments, especially the concierto economico. However, Bilbao claims to have defended Navarrese fueros and to have prevented homogenization designs against the province, promoted by the Ministry of Economy.

Dignitary
As Minister of Justice and the regime's top lawyer Bilbao gave shape to Ley Constitutiva de las Cortes (1942) and according to it he was doubly entitled – as member of Consejo Nacional and as a minister – to enter the Francoist quasi-parliament when it first assembled in 1943. As part of his balancing game, intended to keep different political groupings in check, Franco awarded the speaker role to the Carlists and handpicked Bilbao for the post. He retained the position during 22 years and 8 successive turns, in 1946, 1949, 1952, 1955, 1958, 1961 and 1964, until he resigned due to his age in 1965; during his tenure there were some 4,000 laws adopted. As Presidente de las Cortes Bilbao enjoyed one of the most prestigious and distinguished positions in the Francoist Spain, though there was very little if any political power attached. As one of the top-placed Carlists within the regime Bilbao was also supposed to represent Traditionalist roots and broad political adherence to the regime.

Having sat 35 years in the Restauración parliament, the Primoderiverista Asamblea Nacional, the republican Cortes and the Francoist Cortes Españolas, Bilbao remains the longest serving 20th century Spanish deputy and one of the longest serving Spanish MPs ever. His first and his last days in the diet are spanned by 49 years, which is also a record in Spanish parliamentary history.

In 1947 he was the key author of Ley de Sucesión, the law which officially established Spain as the monarchy and opened a vague path for royal restoration, at the same time stabilizing the rule of Franco as Jefe de Estado; it was protested by both Alfonsist and Carlist claimants, Don Juan and Don Javier. According to the law, by virtue of his parliament speaker role Bilbao entered two newly established bodies: Consejo del Reino and Consejo de Regencia. The former, a peculiar diarchic structure for an authoritarian monarchy proposed earlier by Primo de Rivera, was designed as a special deputy to the executive. It was supposed to assist the Head of State on matters falling into his exclusive competence and was presided by Bilbao himself. The latter, composed of 3 officials, was to act as an interim regency during transition to Franco's successor or in his absence. The sole period it actually functioned was 9 days in October 1949, during the one and only Franco's foreign trip after the Civil War.

Relations with Falangism

During 30 years of activity within the Francoist regime Bilbao maintained a perfectly loyal posture; he was later given credit for coining the royally-sounding phrase "Francisco Franco, Caudillo de España por la gracia de Dios". He is not known to have participated in any sort of conspiracy, opposition or even protest to Franco personally. His political efforts were principally directed at keeping the hardline Falangists at bay, occasionally combined with a rather timid advocacy of the monarchist idea.

In the summer of 1940 Ramón Serrano Suñer came out with Ley de Organización del Estado, a draft aimed at giving Falange central role in the totalitarian new structure. The plan elicited a letter of protest from Bilbao, who denounced "systematic interjection of the party" in the organs of the state. The dissent was shared by most monarchists and part of the army; as a result, the project was shelved and the Francoist system evolved along more hybrid lines. Discontent between the Falange diehards and the monarchists made Bilbao resign as a minister early August 1942; he changed his mind having received a flattering letter from Franco. Soon afterwards the Begoña incident produced a showdown between the Carlists and the Falangists, with general Varela demanding that Falange is brought into line and the monarchy restoration process begins. Bilbao lent Varela his backing, but Franco outmaneuvered the dissidents and talked them into compliance, though the standoff eventually led to sidetracking of Serrano and de-emphasizing of Falangism. The last major confrontation between syndicalist hardliners and monarchists took place in late 1956; Bilbao compared Arrese's draft of Leyes Fundamentales to "Soviet totalitarianism" and led the coalition of monarchists, Catholic hierarchy and the military against the project; the climax produced cabinet reshuffle, sidetracking of Arrese and ultimately power shifting to the technocrats.

Due to his age starting late 1950s Bilbao became sort of a decorative figure, until in 1965 he resigned from all political functions quoting his declining years. As a private retiree he could have afforded more frankness and as late as 1969 he publicly expressed hardly veiled lack of enthusiasm for the perceived Falangist domination in the Cortes, be it during his presidency or afterwards.

Relations with Carlism

Following his expulsion from the Comunión Bilbao's relations with mainstream Carlism were reduced to nil. When in late 1942 the Carlists dashed any hopes about preserving their identity within FET, Fal Conde declared that those previously expulsed might get re-admitted provided they break any links with Falange. Bilbao, however, was explicitly excluded from the scheme. Lambasted by mainstream Carlists as double traitor who already abandoned Don Jaime in the 1920s, Bilbao had even to take minor snubs in the Cortes. He did not join Reclamación del poder, a protest letter signed by the Javieristas and delivered to Franco in 1943.

Though counted by Don Javier amongst "camaradas" of the treacherous Rodezno, Bilbao did not follow his course of approaching Don Juan as the legitimate Carlist claimant. Instead, together with other Traditionalists like Joaquín Bau, Iturmendi or del Burgo, in 1943 he re-launched the candidature of Karl Pius Habsburg, styled as Carlos VIII and, within the limits permitted by the Francoist regime, he cautiously supported Carloctavismo until the claimant unexpectedly died in 1953. When in mid-1950s Carlism changed its strategy towards Francoism from opposition to cautious collaboration, the distance between Bilbao and the party shortened. The new breed of Carlist activists, especially the young anti-Traditionalist entourage of Don Javier's son, Carlos Hugo, were keen to use Bilbao in their own gamble for power. Though they despised Bilbao as traitor, in 1959 the group invited him to join Junta Directiva Central, a front-office sheltering their semi-political initiatives, like Círculos Culturales Vázquez de Mella or the Azada y asta periodical.

Most probably the senile Bilbao was unaware of the power struggle already rife within Carlism, with reactionary Traditionalists confronted by the socialist Progressists. In 1963 as the Cortes speaker he sent a greeting telegram to the Carlist annual amassment at Montejurra, at that time serving as key event in the Huguista bid for power and as promotional stage for Carlos Hugo himself. Already a political retiree and faced with perspective of Juan Carlos declared the future king, in 1969 Bilbao observed that it would not be intelligent to stumble twice over the same stone; a year before death he voiced in favor of Don Javier. The only notable Carlist present on his funeral was José Luis Zamanillo.

Other, reception and legacy

Bilbao was member of many juridical bodies, first to be mentioned Real Academia de Jurisprudencia, which he led since 1946, Real Academia de Ciencias Morales y Políticas and Sección de Ciencias Jurídicas de la Academia de Bilbao. Though he did not pursue academic career, Bilbao was temporarily professor of law at Universidad Libre de Vizcaya. He presided over Asociación de antiguos alumnos de la Universidad de Deusto. In 1947 awarded the Hijo Predilecto title from the Bilbao ayuntamiento and the Hijo Benemerito title from the Diputación de Bizkaia; in 1955 he was nominated honorary mayor of Durango.

Though he is not acknowledged as a theorist and author, he wrote some works, spanning from history (La cuestión social: Aparisi y Guijarro 1941) to philosophy of law (La idea del orden como fundamiento de una filosofia política 1945), history of law (Jaime Balmes y el pensamiento filosófico actual 1949) and theory of law (La idea de la justicia y singularmente de la justicia social 1949, De la persona individual come sujeto primario en el Derecho Público 1949, De las teorias relativistas y su oposición a la idea del derecho romano 1953). Collaborated with a number of newspapers and periodicals, like Diario de Navarra, El Fuerista, El Diario Vasco, El Pueblo Vasco, El Correo Español, La Gaceta del Norte, El Pensamiento Navarro and El Día.

Bilbao was awarded Gran Cruz de la Orden de Isabel la Católica, also decorated with Gran Cruz de Carlos III, Gran Cruz del Mérito Naval, Cruz Meritísima de San Raimunde do Peñafort and Gran Cruz de la Orden Plana. In 1961 he was made marques de Bilbao y Eguía, the title which upon his death passed to his brother, Hilario. In 2006 Audiencia Naciónal, the Spanish high court, attempted to formally acknowledge Bilbao as a criminal guilty of crimes against humanity, but due to procedural reasons this initiative bore no fruit. In contemporary Spanish public discourse he is sometimes referred to favorably as "Vasco de leyenda" or neutrally as "en cierto modo el espécimen del politico vasco ultraconservador". More frequently, however, he is highly criticized as "franquista" or "fascista". Leftist political groupings demand that his portrait is removed from the Spanish Cortes, where it is currently on display. Bilbao has earned no monography so far, be it either a full-scale biography or a smaller piece.

See also
 Electoral Carlism (Restoration)
 Carlo-francoism

Footnotes

Further reading
 Martin Blinkhorn, Carlism and Crisis in Spain 1931-1939, Cambridge 1975, 
 Julian Casanova, Francisco Espinosa Maestre, Conxita Mir, Francisco Moreno Gómez, Morir, matar, sobrevivir: la violencia en la dictadura de Franco, Barcelona 2004, 9788484325062

External links
 Bilbao's birth certificate
 Bilbao at official Cortes service
 Bilbao at Basque encyclopaedia
 crime against humanity charge
 Memoria Histórica site dedicated to the victims of Francoism
 Bilbao's speech in the Cortes (1946) video
 Bilbao handing over to Iturmendi (1965) video
 Bilbao's obituary
 

1879 births
1970 deaths
Basque Carlist politicians
Politicians from Bilbao
Spanish Roman Catholics
Carlists
Members of the Congress of Deputies (Spain)
Members of the Senate of Spain
Members of the Congress of Deputies of the Second Spanish Republic
Members of the Cortes Españolas
Presidents of the Congress of Deputies (Spain)
20th-century Spanish lawyers
Spanish people of the Spanish Civil War (National faction)
Spanish prisoners and detainees
University of Deusto alumni
Recipients of the Order of Isabella the Catholic
Spanish politicians convicted of crimes
University of Salamanca alumni
Government ministers during the Francoist dictatorship
Basque prisoners and detainees
FET y de las JONS politicians